The cinema of Australia had its beginnings with the 1906 production of The Story of the Kelly Gang, arguably the world's first feature film. Since then, Australian crews have produced many films, a number of which have received international recognition. Many actors and filmmakers with international reputations started their careers in Australian films, and many of these have established lucrative careers in larger film-producing centres such as the United States.

Commercially successful Australian films include: Crocodile Dundee, George Miller's Mad Max: Fury Road, Baz Luhrmann's Moulin Rouge!, and Chris Noonan's Babe. Award-winning productions include Picnic at Hanging Rock, Gallipoli, The Tracker, Shine and Ten Canoes.

Cinema in Australia is subject to censorship, called classification. Films may be refused classification, which means they are effectively banned.

History
The Australian film critic David Stratton characterized the history of the country's film as one of "boom and bust": there have been deep troughs, during which few films were made for decades, and high peaks, during which a glut of films reached the market.

Pioneer days – 1890s to 1910
The first public screenings of films in Australia took place in October 1896, within a year of the world's first screening in Paris by Lumière brothers. On 22 August 1896, the first films projected to a paying audience in Australia were at Harry Rickards’ Melbourne Opera House (later known as the Tivoli Theatre). The film by magician Carl Hertz was screened as part of a variety show act. Australian tours with similar projection machines followed.
Australia's first cinema, the Salon Lumière at 237 Pitt Street, Sydney, was operating in October 1896, and showed the first Australian-produced short film on 27 October 1896.

The Athenaeum Hall in Collins Street, Melbourne, operated as a dance hall from the 1880s, and from time to time would provide alternative entertainment to patrons. In October 1896 it exhibited the first movie film shown in Australia, within a year of the first public screening of a film in Paris on 28 December 1895 by the French Lumière brothers. The Athenaeum would continue screenings, such as Life in Our Navy, a 60,000 foot film of life on HMS Jupiter, shown on 26 January 1901 by G. H. Snazelle, who provided additional entertainment.

A landmark of newsreel photography was in 1897, when films of both the Caulfield Cup and Melbourne Cup were screened at the Melbourne Opera House on the evenings of the race. The events had been captured on film for W. C. Baxter and developed the same day by photographer Robert William Harvie (died 5 October 1922) and inventor Ernest J. Thwaites (c. 1873 – 12 July 1933).

Some of the earliest movie film shot in Australia consisted of films of Aboriginal dancers in Central Australia, shot by anthropologists Baldwin Spencer and F. J. Gillen between 1900 and 1903. They pioneered sound recording on wax cylinders and shot their films under very difficult conditions.

The earliest feature-length narrative film in the world was the Australian-produced The Story of the Kelly Gang (1906), shown at the Athenaeum. The film, written and directed by Charles Tait, included several of his family members. The film was also exhibited in the United Kingdom in January 1908.

Melbourne also hosted one of the world's first film studios, the Limelight Department, operated by the Salvation Army in Australia between 1897 and 1910. The Limelight Department produced evangelical material for use by the Salvation Army, as well as carrying out private and government contracts. In its 19 years of operation the Limelight Department produced about 300 films of various lengths, making it the largest film-producer of its time. The major innovation of the Limelight Department came in 1899 when Herbert Booth and Joseph Perry began work on Soldiers of the Cross, described by some as the first feature-length film ever produced. Soldiers of the Cross fortified the Limelight Department as a major player in the early film-industry. The Limelight Department also produced a film recording of the Federation of Australia.

Boom and bust – 1910s to 1920s
The 1910s were a "boom" period in Australian cinema. Activity had begun slowly in the 1900s, and 1910 saw four narrative films released, then 51 in 1911, 30 in 1912, and 17 in 1913, and back to four in 1914, when the beginning of World War I brought a temporary pause in film-making. While these numbers may seem small in the 21st century, Australia was one of the most prolific film-producing countries at the time. In all, between 1906 and 1928 Australia made 150 narrative feature films, almost 90 of them between 1910 and 1912.

A general consolidation took place in the early 1910s in the production, distribution and exhibition of films in Australia. By 1912 numerous independent producers had merged into Australasian Films and Union Theaters (now known as Event Cinemas), which established control over film distributors and cinemas and required smaller producers to deal with the cartel. Some view the arrangement as opening the way for American distributors in the 1920s to sign exclusive deals with Australian cinemas to exhibit only their own products, thereby shutting out the local product and crippling the local film-industry.

Various other explanations attempt to account for the decline of the industry in the 1920s. Some historians point to falling audience numbers, a lack of interest in Australian product and narratives, and Australia's participation in the war. Also, an official ban on bushranger films occurred in 1912. With the suspension of local film-production, Australian cinema-chains sought alternative products in the United States and realised that Australian-produced films were much more expensive than the imported product, which were priced cheaply as production expenses had already been recouped in the home market. To redress this imbalance, the federal government of Australia imposed a tax on imported film in 1914, but this was removed by 1918.

Whatever the explanation, by 1923 American films dominated the Australian market, with 94% of all exhibited films coming from the United States.

1930s–1960s

In 1930, F. W. Thring (1883–1936) established the Efftee Studios based in Melbourne to make talking films using optical sound equipment imported from the United States. The first Australian sound films appeared  in 1931: the company produced Diggers (1931), A Co-respondent's Course (1931), The Haunted Barn (1931) and The Sentimental Bloke (1932). During the five years of its existence, Efftee produced nine features, over 80 shorts and several stage-productions. Notable collaborators included C. J. Dennis, George Wallace and Frank Harvey. Film production continued only until 1934, when it ceased as a protest over the refusal of the Australian government to set Australian film-quotas, followed soon by Thring's death in 1936. It was estimated that Thring lost over £75,000 of his own money on his filmmaking and theatrical ventures.

Ken G. Hall became a driving force in establishing Cinesound Productions in 1931. The company became one of Australia's first feature-film production companies and operated into the early 1940s, becoming Australia's leading domestic studio based on the Hollywood model. The company also used the Hollywood model for the promotion of its films and attempted to promote a star system. It was particularly successful with the On Our Selection (1932) series of comedies, based on the popular writings of author Steele Rudd, which featured the adventures of a fictional Australian farming family, the Rudds, and the perennial father-and-son duo, "Dad and Dave". Despite its ambitions, Cinesound produced only 17 feature-films, all but one of them directed by Ken Hall. Though financially successful, the company ceased making feature films following the 1939 outbreak of World War II.

In 1933, In the Wake of the Bounty, directed by Charles Chauvel, cast Tasmanian-born Errol Flynn in a leading role, before he went on to a celebrated Hollywood career. Chauvel directed a number of successful Australian films, including 1944's World War II classic The Rats of Tobruk (which starred Peter Finch and Chips Rafferty) and 1955's Jedda, which was notable as the first Australian film shot in colour, and as the first to feature Aboriginal actors in lead roles and to enter the Cannes Film Festival.

In Britain, the Cinematograph Films Act 1927 established a quota of films that had to be shown in British cinemas.  One could shoot compliant films in the British Empire as well as in Great Britain;  this stimulated Australian film-production. However the Cinematograph Films Act 1938 mollified the British film industry by including only films made by and shot in Great Britain in the quota - this removed Australian films from the film quota in the UK, and saw the loss of a guaranteed market for Australian films.

Kokoda Front Line! (1942), directed by Ken G. Hall, won Australia's first Oscar. Chips Rafferty and Peter Finch became prominent international stars of the period. Rafferty's onscreen image as a lanky, laconic bushman struck a chord with Australian filmgoers, and he appeared in iconic early Australian films such as Forty Thousand Horsemen (1940), The Rats of Tobruk (1944), The Overlanders (1946) and Eureka Stockade (1949) (Overlanders and Eureka were part of a series of Australian-themed films produced by Britain's iconic Ealing Studios). In Hollywood, Rafferty also appeared in Australian-themed films, including The Desert Rats (1953), The Sundowners (1960) and Mutiny on the Bounty (1962). Similarly, Peter Finch starred in quintessentially Australian roles (such as "digger" and stockman) through a series of popular films and had a successful and diverse screen career in Britain and the United States.

Both Ron Randell and Rod Taylor began their acting careers in Australia - initially in radio and on stage before appearing in such Australian films as Smithy (1946) for the former and Long John Silver (1954) for the latter. They each transferred to the United States to become Hollywood leading men in a number of films of the late 1940s (Randell) and both from the 1950s onwards. Taylor had starring roles in The Time Machine (1960) and The Birds (1963) as well as in several American television-series such as Hong Kong (1960-1961).

In the 1950s British and American production-companies made several notable films in Australia based on stories from Australian literature (generally with strong rural themes). These included A Town Like Alice (1956, which starred Virginia McKenna and Peter Finch); The Shiralee (1957, also starring Peter Finch with Australian actors Charles Tingwell, Bill Kerr and Ed Devereaux in supporting roles); Robbery Under Arms (1957, again starring Finch); and Summer of the Seventeenth Doll (1959, starring Ernest Borgnine, John Mills and Angela Lansbury). In 1960, The Sundowners was shot partly in the Snowy Mountains of New South Wales with foreign leads Deborah Kerr, Robert Mitchum, and Peter Ustinov but a supporting cast including Australians - Chips Rafferty, John Meillon and Leonard Teale.

In 1958, Australian Film Institute was formed and in the same year began awarding the Australian Film Institute Awards.

After filming Whiplash in the country in 1960, Peter Graves said that the biggest problem was the shortage of Australian actors. Australian film-production reached a low ebb with few notable productions during the 1960s. The 1966 comedy They're a Weird Mob, starring Walter Chiari, Chips Rafferty and Claire Dunne, was a rare hit of the period which also documented something of the changing face of Australian society: telling the story of a newly-arrived Italian immigrant who, working as a labourer in Sydney, becomes mates with his co-workers, despite some difficulties with Australian slang and culture. The film foreshadowed the successful approaching "New Wave" of Australian cinema of the 1970s that would often showcase colloquial Australian culture.

Overseas cinema continued to attract Australian actors as "action-men" with the casting of Australian George Lazenby to replace Sean Connery in portraying the superspy James Bond in the 1969 U.K. film On Her Majesty's Secret Service.

Renaissance – 1970s and 1980s

John Gorton, Prime Minister of Australia from 1968 to 1971, initiated several forms of government support for film and the arts, including the Australian Film Development Corporation. The Gough Whitlam government (1972–75) continued the support via its successor the Australian Film Commission, and state governments also established assistance programs. These measures led to a resurgence of Australian film-making in both the low budget 16mm format and 35mm cinema - the Australian New Wave - which lasted until the mid-to-late 1980s. The era also marked the emergence of the "Ozploitation" style – characterised by the exploitation of colloquial Australian culture.

Also notable during this era was the effect of the  growing feminist movement. The role of women's films was discussed at the Women’s Liberation Conference in Melbourne in 1970, and groups such as the Feminist Film Workers collective (1970s and 1980s), Sydney Women"s Film Group (SWFG, 1972–), Melbourne Women's Film Group (1973–), Reel Women (1979 to 1983 in Melbourne), and  Women's Film Unit (Sydney and Melbourne, 1984/5) were established. A number of filmmakers, including Jeni Thornley, Sarah Gibson, Susan Lambert, Martha Ansara, Margot Nash and Megan McMurchy, were involved in these groups. The 1975 International Women's Film Festival, the first of its kind, was initiated by the SWFG, but groups around the country organised screening events in other state capitals. In Melbourne and Sydney the festivals ran for nine days (with an audience of around 56,000), and in the other states they spanned two to three days.

Films such as Picnic at Hanging Rock (directed by Peter Weir, 1975) and Sunday Too Far Away (Ken Hannam, 1975) made an impact on the international scene. The 1970s and 1980s are regarded by many as a "golden age" of Australian cinema, with many successful films, from the dark dystopian fiction of Mad Max (George Miller, 1979) to the romantic comedy of Crocodile Dundee (Peter Faiman, 1986) and the emergence of such film-directing auteurs as Gillian Armstrong, Phillip Noyce and Bruce Beresford.

A major theme of Australian cinema which matured in the 1970s was one of survival in the harsh Australian landscape. A number of thrillers and horror-films - dubbed "outback gothic" - have appeared, including Wake in Fright, Walkabout, The Cars That Ate Paris and Picnic at Hanging Rock in the 1970s, Razorback, Long Weekend and Shame in the 1980s and Japanese Story, The Proposition and Wolf Creek in the 2000s. These films depict the Australian bush and its creatures as deadly, and its people as outcasts and psychopaths. These elements combine with futuristic post-apocalyptic themes in the Mad Max series. 1971's Walkabout was a British film, set in Australia, which became a forerunner to many Australian films related to indigenous themes; it introduced David Gulpilil to cinematic audiences. 1976's The Chant of Jimmie Blacksmith directed by Fred Schepisi re-told an award-winning historical drama from the book by Thomas Keneally about the tragic story of an Aboriginal bushranger.

Classic stories from Australian literature and Australian history continued to provide popular cinematic adaptations during the 1970s and 1980s. Gillian Armstrong's My Brilliant Career (1979) featured Judy Davis and Sam Neill in early lead-roles. 1982's We of the Never Never followed up on the theme of the female experience of life in the Australian bush. 1982's The Man from Snowy River, starring Tom Burlinson and Sigrid Thornton, dramatised the classic Banjo Paterson poem of that name and became one of the all-time box-office successes of Australian cinema. In addition to the serious historical dramas popular in the 1970s, a number of films celebrating and satirizing Australian colloquial culture appeared over the decade, including: The Adventures of Barry McKenzie (1972), Alvin Purple (1973), and Barry McKenzie Holds His Own (1974). The Barry McKenzie films saw performing-artist and writer Barry Humphries collaborating with director Bruce Beresford. In 1976, Peter Finch won a posthumous Academy Award for Best Actor for his role in the American satire Network, thus becoming the first Australian to win an Oscar for best actor.

1980's Breaker Morant (starring Jack Thompson and Edward Woodward) dramatised the controversial trial of an Australian soldier during the Boer War of 1899-1902; there followed 1981's World War I drama Gallipoli (directed by Peter Weir and starring Mel Gibson). These films, now considered classics of Australian cinema, explored contemporary Australian identity through dramatic episodes in Australian history. Gibson went on to further success in 1982's The Year of Living Dangerously before transferring to pursue his Hollywood career as an actor and director. Many other Australian stars would follow his path to international stardom in the coming decades. The director of The Year of Living Dangerously, Peter Weir, also made a successful transition to Hollywood. Weir contributed to the screenplay along with its original author, Christopher Koch, and playwright David Williamson. Williamson rose to prominence in the early 1970s, and has gone on to write several other original scripts and screenplays made into successful Australian films, including: Don's Party (1976); Gallipoli (1981), Emerald City (1988), and Balibo (2009).

Actor/comedian Paul Hogan wrote the screenplay and starred in the title role in his first film, Crocodile Dundee (1986), about a down-to-earth hunter who travels from the Australian outback to New York City. The movie became the most successful Australian film ever, and launched Hogan's international film career. Following the success of Crocodile Dundee, Hogan starred in the sequel, Crocodile Dundee II in 1988. 1988 also saw the release of the drama Evil Angels (released outside of Australia and New Zealand as A Cry in the Dark) about the Lindy Chamberlain saga, in which a dingo took a baby at Ayers Rock and her mother was accused of having murdered the child.

Nicole Kidman began appearing in Australian children's TV and film in the early 1980s – including starring roles in BMX Bandits and Bush Christmas. During the 1980s she appeared in several Australian productions, including Emerald City (1988), and Bangkok Hilton (1989). In 1989 Kidman starred in Dead Calm alongside Sam Neill and Billy Zane. The thriller garnered strong reviews, and Hollywood roles followed.

1990–2000

The 1990s proved a successful decade for Australian film and introduced several new stars to a global audience. Low budget films such as the comedy/drama Muriel's Wedding, starring Toni Collette, the gently satirical suburban comedy The Castle directed by Rob Sitch (which cast Eric Bana in his first prominent film role), and Baz Luhrmann's flamboyant Strictly Ballroom each attained commercial and critical success, and explored quirky characters inhabiting contemporary Australian suburbia – marking something of a departure from the Outback and historical sagas which obtained success in the 1970s and 1980s. Stephan Elliott's 1994 film The Adventures of Priscilla, Queen of the Desert mixed traditional outback cinematography and landscape with contemporary urban sub-culture: following three drag queens on a road trip to Central Australia.

While a number of major international stars gained early prominence in Australia over the period, an important stable of established and emerging local stars with prodigious film credits remained prominent, including screen veterans Charles Tingwell, Bill Hunter, Jack Thompson, Bryan Brown and Chris Haywood.

The World War II drama Blood Oath (1990) debuted both Russell Crowe and Jason Donovan, in minor cinematic roles. Crowe demonstrated his versatility as an actor in this early period of his career by starring soon after as a street gang Melbourne skinhead in 1992's Romper Stomper and then as an inner-Sydney working-class gay man in 1994's The Sum of Us before transferring to the US to commence his Hollywood career.

George Miller's Babe (1995) employed new digital effects to make a barnyard come alive and went on to become one of Australia's highest-grossing films. The 1996 drama Shine achieved an Academy Award for Best Actor award for Geoffrey Rush and Gregor Jordan's 1999 film Two Hands gave Heath Ledger his first leading role.

2001–2019
After Ledger's successful transition to Hollywood, Jordan and Ledger collaborated again in 2003, with Ledger playing the iconic bushranger title role in the film Ned Kelly, co-starring British actress Naomi Watts.

The canon of films related to Indigenous Australians also increased over the period of the 1990s and early 21st Century, with Nick Parsons' 1996 film Dead Heart featuring Ernie Dingo and Bryan Brown; Rolf de Heer's The Tracker, starring Gary Sweet and David Gulpilil; and Phillip Noyce's Rabbit-Proof Fence in 2002. In 2006, Rolf de Heer's Ten Canoes became the first major feature film to be shot in an Indigenous language and the film was recognised at Cannes and elsewhere.

The shifting demographics of Australia following post-war multicultural immigration was reflected in Australian cinema through the period and in successful films like 1993's The Heartbreak Kid; 1999's Looking for Alibrandi; 2003's Fat Pizza; the Wog Boy comedies and 2007's Romulus, My Father which all dealt with aspects of the migrant experience or Australian subcultures.

Fox Studios Australia and Warner Roadshow Studios had hosted large international productions like The Matrix, Star Wars II, and III.

Rob Sitch and Working Dog Productions followed the success of The Castle with period comedy The Dish, which was the highest grossing Australian film of the Year 2000 and entered the top ten list of highest grossing Australian films. Big budget Australian-international co-productions Moulin Rouge! (Baz Luhrmann, 2001) and Happy Feet (which won the Academy Award for Best Animated Feature for filmmaker George Miller in 2006) also entered the top ten list during the first decade of the new century. Baz Luhrmann directed a series of international hits and returned to Australia for the production of 2008's Australia, which showcased a host of Australian stars including Nicole Kidman, Hugh Jackman and David Wenham and went on to become the second highest-grossing film in Australian cinematic history.

Lantana, directed by Ray Lawrence attained critical and commercial success in 2001 for its examination of a complex series of relationships in suburban Sydney, and events surrounding a mysterious crime. It won seven AFI Awards including Best Picture, Best Director, Best Actor for Anthony LaPaglia and Best Actress for Kerry Armstrong.

Emerging star Sam Worthington had early lead roles in the 2002 mobster black comedy Dirty Deeds and 2003's crime caper Gettin' Square. Gettin Square also featured rising star David Wenham who demonstrated versatility with a string of critically acclaimed roles including the title role in Paul Cox's 1999 biopic Molokai: The Story of Father Damien and the 2001 thriller The Bank, directed by the politically conscious film director Robert Connolly.

In 2005, Little Fish marked a return to Australian film for actress Cate Blanchett and won five Australian Film Institute Awards including Best Actor for Hugo Weaving, Best Actress for Blanchett and Best Supporting Actress for screen veteran Noni Hazlehurst.

In 2008 following Ledger's death, the documentary film celebrating the romps of the Australian New Wave of 1970s and 1980s low-budget cinema: Not Quite Hollywood: The Wild, Untold Story of Ozploitation! The film was directed by Mark Hartley and interviews filmmakers including Quentin Tarantino, Dennis Hopper, George Miller and Barry Humphries.

The early 2000s were generally not successful years for Australian cinema, with several confronting dramas proving unpopular at the box office. In 2008, no Australian movies made $3 million at the box office, but a conscious decision by filmmakers to broaden the types of films being made as well as the range of budgets produced a series of box-office hits at the close of the decade. Strong box office performances were recorded in 2009–10 by Bruce Beresford's Mao's Last Dancer; the Aboriginal musical Bran Nue Dae the dramatization of John Marsden's novel Tomorrow, When the War Began; and the crime drama Animal Kingdom which featured major Australian screen stars Ben Mendelsohn, Joel Edgerton, Guy Pearce and Jacki Weaver. Animal Kingdom achieved success at the 2010 Australian Film Institute Awards and was acclaimed at film festivals around the world. Tomorrow, When the War Began became the highest-grossing domestic film of 2010 and it was nominated for nine Australian Film Institute Awards.

Other award-winning films of the period included Balibo (2009) starring Anthony LaPaglia; Middle Eastern crime flick Cedar Boys (2009) directed by Serhat Caradee; and animated comedy drama Mary and Max.

World War I drama Beneath Hill 60 (2010), directed by Jeremy Sims and starring Brendan Cowell, was nominated for numerous awards and won three.

Sally Riley, as inaugural head of the Indigenous department at ABC Television, after her previous role at the Australian Film Commission (later Screen Australia), has done much to develop Indigenous talent in the film and television industry. Contemporary Indigenous film-makers include Warwick Thornton, Wayne Blair, Trisha Morton-Thomas and Rachel Perkins.

The Australian film industry continues to produce a reasonable number of films each year, but in common with other English-speaking countries, Australia has often found it difficult to compete with the American film industry, the latter helped by having a much larger home market. The most successful Australian actors and filmmakers are easily lured by Hollywood and rarely return to the domestic film industry. The South Australian Film Corporation continues to produce quality films, and Adelaide has been chosen as the location for films such as Hotel Mumbai (2019).

2020–present
An Australian film and TV industry was afflicted by COVID-19 pandemic, with at least 60 shoots being halted and about 20,000 people out of work. On Monday 23 March, all productions funded by Screen Australia were postponed. , after some improvement in COVID-19 statistics in Australia, Screen Australia continues to fund work and process applications, intending to use all of its 2019/20 budget.

Sometimes after reopening movies and TV industries, two other several films including Escape from Pretoria (2020) and James Wan's reboot of video game franchise Mortal Kombat (2021), a feature film production in the state’s history, who were delaying the films during the pandemic.

Genres

Australian Gothic films 
Gothic films incorporate Gothic elements and can be infused within different genres such as horror, romance, science fiction, and comedy. Australian Gothic films have been an accordant genera ever since the 1970s. Gothic Australian films means to make films that are diverse and use camera techniques in different ways to question what the audience may perceive. One of the Australian Gothic films created by female filmmakers Suzan Dermody and Elizabeth Jacka called The Screening of Australia (1987), shows different stylistic thematic terms and was the most successful at showing what is called the ocker, a term to describe a (white) Australian savage man. Other than this, there is a strong relationship between Australian Gothic films and Gothic literature. The characters and the actions that happen in a Gothic novel is created into a Gothic film. Most Gothic novels during the 1970s referred to female characters and their Australian cultural values.  

Although the film Picnic at Hanging Rock (1975) was directed by a male filmmaker, it was written by  female storyteller Joan Lindsay. Lindsay decided to make this film culturally related to Australian societal issues of day-to-day lives. Her film included Gothic materials and gave a twist of horror that later the director will showcase through the mise-en-scene and cinematography. The use of Gothic materials were offered by the filmmakers Dermody and Jacka to other Australian Gothic films that have opened up to a more thematic analysis. Other Gothic films were made to broaden Australian characteristics and features. Smoke Em If You Got ‘Em (1988), produced by Jennifer Hooks, showcased the protagonist in a supernatural horrific way, but also added a comedic twist to not lose its characterization of film style.

Government support

John Gorton, Prime Minister of Australia from 1968–1971, initiated several forms of Government support for Australian film and the arts, establishing the Australian Council for the Arts, the Australian Film Development Corporation and the National Film and Television Training School. Prime Minister Gough Whitlam continued to support Australian film. The South Australian Film Corporation was established in 1972 to promote and produce films, while the Australian Film Commission was created in 1975 to fund and produce internationally competitive films.

The federal Australian government had supported the Australian film industry through the funding and development agencies of Film Finance Corporation Australia, the Australian Film Commission and Film Australia. In 2008 the three agencies were consolidated into Screen Australia.

Government funding bodies
 Screen Australia, successor to
Australian Film Commission,
Film Australia and
 Film Finance Corporation Australia
 Queensland Film Corporation (defunct)
 Screen NSW
 Screenwest
 South Australian Film Corporation
 Tasmanian Film Corporation (defunct)
 VicScreen

Highest-grossing Australian films

Other financial hits 
High-grossing Australian films from earlier decades include:
1900s – The Story of the Kelly Gang (1906) (gross £20,000)
1910s – The Fatal Wedding (1911) (£18,000), The Life Story of John Lee, or The Man They Could Not Hang (1912) (£20,000), The Martyrdom of Nurse Cavell (1915) (£25,000)
1920s – For the Term of His Natural Life (1927) (over £40,000)
1930s – On Our Selection (1932) (£60,000), The Silence of Dean Maitland (1934) (£50,000)
1940s – Forty Thousand Horsemen (1940) (£130,000), Smithy (1946) (over £50,000), The Overlanders (1946) (£250,000), Sons of Matthew (1949)
1950s – Walk Into Paradise (1956)
1960s – They're a Weird Mob (1966) (over $2 million)
1970s – Alvin Purple (1973) ($4.72 million), Picnic at Hanging Rock (1975) (over $5 million), Mad Max (1979) ($100 million)

Directors

 Gillian Armstrong
 Tony Ayres
 Stuart Beattie
 Bruce Beresford
 Charles Chauvel
 Paul Cox
 Kieran Darcy-Smith
 Andrew Dominik
 Kevin James Dobson
 Matt Drummond
 Peter Duncan
 Adam Elliot
 Stephan Elliott
 Richard Franklin (director)
 Rolf de Heer
 Scott Hicks
 John Hillcoat
 P. J. Hogan
 Gregor Jordan
 Ray Lawrence
 Raymond Longford
 Baz Luhrmann
 James McTeigue
 George Miller
 George T. Miller
 Russell Mulcahy
 Chris Noonan
 Phillip Noyce
 Matthew Victor Pastor
 Alex Proyas
 Sally Riley
 Fred Schepisi
 Anupam Sharma
 Rob Sitch
 Kriv Stenders
 Warwick Thornton
 Brian Trenchard-Smith
 James Wan
 Rachel Ward
 Peter Weir
 Simon Wincer
 Leigh Whannell

Actors

The Australian film industry has produced a number of successful actors, actresses, writers, directors and filmmakers many of whom have been known internationally.

Actors

 David Argue
 Simon Baker
 Eric Bana
 Steve Bisley
 Graeme Blundell
 Grant Bowler
 Luke Bracey
 Bryan Brown
 Dieter Brummer
 Tom Burlinson
 Michael Caton
 Jason Clarke
 Robert Coleby
 Vince Colosimo
 Jai Courtney
 Brendan Cowell
 Russell Crowe
 Max Cullen
 Stephen Curry
 Bernard Curry
 Cameron Daddo
 Alan Dale
 Matt Day
 Ed Devereaux
 Alex Dimitriades
 Ernie Dingo
 Firass Dirani
 Michael Dorman
 Joel Edgerton
 Jacob Elordi
 Dan Ewing
 Eamon Farren
 Maurie Fields
 Travis Fimmel
 Peter Finch
 Errol Flynn
 David Franklin
 Colin Friels
 Dean Geyer
 Mel Gibson
 Max Gillies
 Marcus Graham
 David Gulpilil
 Anthony Hayes
 Mark Hembrow
 Chris Hemsworth
 Liam Hemsworth
 Luke Hemsworth
 Damon Herriman
 Paul Hogan
 Barry Humphries
 Bill Hunter
 Hugh Jackman
 Shane Jacobson
 John Jarratt
 Hugh Keays-Byrne
 Sean Keenan
 Graham Kennedy
 Ryan Kwanten
 Anthony LaPaglia
 Jonathan LaPaglia
 Daniel Lapaine
 Josh Lawson
 George Lazenby
 Heath Ledger
 Ewen Leslie
 Mark Little
 Keiynan Lonsdale
 Costas Mandylor
 Callan McAuliffe
 Leo McKern
 Julian McMahon
 Ray Meagher
 John Meillon
 Ben Mendelsohn
 Levi Miller
 Tim Minchin
 Dacre Montgomery
 Callan Mulvey
 Matthew Nable
 John Noble
 Alex O’Loughlin
 Barry Otto
 Steve Peacocke
 Guy Pearce
 Thaao Penghlis
 Peter Phelps
 Dominic Purcell
 Wayne Pygram
 Ingo Rademacher
 Chips Rafferty
 Richard Roxburgh
 Jay Ryan
 Geoffrey Rush
 Angus Sampson
 Benedict Samuel
 Xavier Samuel
 Yahoo Serious
 Anthony Simcoe
 Jaason Simmons
 Jeremy Sims
 Troye Sivan
 Kodi Smit-McPhee
 Jesse Spencer
 Sullivan Stapleton
 Gary Sweet
 Nick Tate
 Noah Taylor
 Rod Taylor
 Jack Thompson
 Brenton Thwaites
 Charles Tingwell
 Lani Tupu
 Rhys Wakefield
 John Waters
 Hugo Weaving
 David Wenham
 Leigh Whannell
 Sam Worthington
 Dan Wyllie
 Lincoln Younes
 Aden Young

Actresses

 Judith Anderson
 Jacinda Barrett
 Lorraine Bayly
 Claudia Black
 Cate Blanchett
 Rebecca Breeds
 Emily Browning
 Rose Byrne
 Bianca Chiminello
 Diane Cilento
 Justine Clarke
 Adelaide Clemens
 Toni Collette
 Alyssa-Jane Cook
 Abbie Cornish
 Ruth Cracknell
 Linda Cropper
 Kimberley Davies
 Essie Davis
 Judy Davis
 Jessica De Gouw
 Elizabeth Debicki
 Jeanie Drynan
 Courtney Eaton
 Gigi Edgley
 Belinda Emmett
 Alice Englert
 Indiana Evans
 Isla Fisher
 Lucy Fry
 Megan Gale
 Melissa George
 Rachel Griffiths
 Noni Hazlehurst
 Bella Heathcote
 Cariba Heine
 Virginia Hey
 Raelee Hill
 Claire Holt
 Wendy Hughes
 Natalie Imbruglia
 Stephanie Jacobsen
 Melissa Jaffer
 Adelaide Kane
 Claudia Karvan
 Nicole Kidman
 Asher Keddie
 Shiori Kutsuna
 Katherine Langford
 Isabel Lucas
 Lottie Lyell
 Danielle Macdonald
 Tammy MacIntosh
 Elle Macpherson
 Deborah Mailman
 Jessica Marais
 Miriam Margolyes
 Jacqueline McKenzie
 Robin McLeavy
 Dannii Minogue
 Kylie Minogue
 Sophie Monk
 Poppy Montgomery
 Jessica Napier
 Robyn Nevin
 Olivia Newton-John
 Miranda Otto
 Teresa Palmer
 Susie Porter
 Emilie de Ravin
 Angourie Rice
 Rebecca Riggs
 Margot Robbie
 Ruby Rose
 Portia de Rossi
 Greta Scacchi
 Eliza Scanlen
 Pallavi Sharda
 Sia
 Sarah Snook
 Yael Stone
 Yvonne Strahovski
 Tammin Sursok
 Alyssa Sutherland
 Magda Szubanski
 Rachael Taylor
 Sigrid Thornton
 Sonia Todd
 Phoebe Tonkin
 Anna Torv
 Holly Valance
 Sharni Vinson
 Leeanna Walsman
 Gemma Ward
 Mia Wasikowska
 Naomi Watts
 Jacki Weaver
 Samara Weaving
 Peta Wilson
 Rebel Wilson
 Sarah Wynter
 Odessa Young

See also

 Antipodean Film Festival
 Australian Directors Guild
 Australian Writers' Guild
 Event Hospitality and Entertainment
 List of Australian films
 List of films set in Australia
 List of films shot in Adelaide
 List of films shot in Darwin
 List of films shot in Melbourne
 List of films shot in Queensland
 List of films shot in Sydney
 List of films shot in Tasmania
 List of films shot in Western Australia
 List of cinema of the world
 Television in Australia
 World cinema

References

Literature

Encyclopedia and reference 
 Goldsmith, Ben, Ryan, Mark David, and Lealand, Geoff Eds. "Directory of World Cinema : Australia and New Zealand 2". Bristol: Intellect, 2014. 
 Murray, Scott, ed. Australian Film: 1978–1994. Melbourne: Oxford University Press, 1995. 
 Pike, Andrew and Ross Cooper. Australian Film: 1900–1977. revised ed. Melbourne: Oxford University Press, 1998. 
 McFarland, Brian, Geoff Mayer and Ina Bertrand, eds. The Oxford Companion to Australian Film. Melbourne: Oxford University Press, 1999. 
 Moran, Albert and Errol Vieth. Historical Dictionary of Australian and New Zealand Cinema. Lanham, Md: Scarecrow Press, 2005. 
 Reade, Eric. Australian Silent Films: A Pictorial History of Silent Films from 1896 to 1926. Melbourne: Lansdowne Press, 1970.
 Verhoeven, Deb, ed. Twin Peeks: Australian and New Zealand Feature Films. Melbourne: Damned Publishing, 1999.

Critique and commentary 
 Ryan, Mark David and Goldsmith, Ben, Australian Screen in the 2000s. Palgrave Macmillan, Cham, Switzerland. 
 Collins, Felicity, and Theresa Davis. Australian Cinema After Mabo. Sydney: Cambridge University Press, 2004.
 Dawson, Jonathan, and Bruce Molloy, eds. Queensland Images in Film and Television. Brisbane: University of Queensland Press, 1990.
 Dermody, Susan and Elizabeth Jacka, eds. The Screening of Australia, Volume 1: Anatomy of a Film Industry. Sydney: Currency Press, 1987.
——— . The Screening of Australia, Volume 2: Anatomy of a National Cinema. Sydney: Currency Press, 1988.
 Moran, Albert and Tom O’Regan, eds. An Australian Film Reader (Australian Screen Series). Sydney: Currency Press, 1985.
 Moran, Albert and Errol Vieth. Film in Australia: An Introduction Sydney: Cambridge University Press, 2006.
 O'Regan, Tom. Australian National Cinema. London: Routledge, 1996.
 Ryan, Mark, David (2009),'Whither Culture? Australian Horror Films and the Limitations of Cultural Policy', Media International Australia: Incorporating Culture and Policy, no. 133, pp. 43–55.
 Stratton, David. The Avocado Plantation: Boom and Bust in the Australian Film Industry. Sydney : Pan Macmillan, 1990. 465p. 
 Verhoeven, Deb. Sheep and the Australian Cinema. Melbourne : MUP, 2006.

External links

Commonwealth and State Government Sites 
 australianscreen – Australia's audiovisual heritage online
 Screen Australia
 National Film and Sound Archive of Australia
 Australian Government site on Film in Australia
 Pacific Film and Television Corporation (Queensland)
 New South Wales Film and Television Office
 Australian Centre for the Moving Image (Victoria)
 South Australia Film Corporation
 Filmwest (Western Australia)
 Australian Film, Television and Radio School
 Film Making studies in Australia

Non-government sites 
 film.org.au: the best of Australian Films
 Internet Movie Database, Australia
 Australian Cinemas Map
 Ozmovies Australian Film Database, Australia
 TV Cream on Australian films
 Anything Oz or New Zealand Films site
 Cinema and Audiences Research Project (CAARP)